John E. Gerin M.D. (December 10, 1849 – February 15, 1931) was the physician at Auburn State Prison in Auburn, New York under warden George W. Benham. Gerin performed the autopsy on Leon Czolgosz.

History
Gerin was born in Cobourg, Canada West in 1849 and attended Queen's University where he attained his M.D. In 1901 he performed the autopsy on Leon Czolgosz. In 1913 he was charged with brutality and indifference to suffering. He died at his home in Auburn in 1931 and is buried at St. Joseph's Cemetery.

References

People from Auburn, New York
Physicians from New York (state)
Assassination of William McKinley
1849 births
1931 deaths